Warburton Ledge is a massive flat ridge (3200 m) that is ice covered and steep sided, located 4 nautical miles (7 km) east of Mount McClintock in Britannia Range. Named by Advisory Committee on Antarctic Names (US-ACAN) after Joseph A. Warburton, Desert Research Institute, University of Nevada, Reno, United States Antarctic Research Program (USARP) scientist in charge of the RISP meteorological program, 1974-75 field season.

Ridges of Oates Land
Britannia Range (Antarctica)